Hunting a Psychopath: The East Area Rapist/Original Night Stalker Investigation – The Original Investigator Speaks Out is a non-fiction book by retired detective Richard Shelby. It chronicles Richard Shelby's investigation of the Original Night Stalker as he remembers it. It was originally published on September 15, 2014.

Background 
Based on the serial rapist and killer, the Original Night Stalker also known as The East Area Rapist, Richard Shelby begins the story in the early 1970s of Visalia, California. As he progresses through the investigation, he recalls crimes throughout California that span the years of 1974 to 1986.

Contents 
The book contains 69 chapters, however, there are 9 sections that are not counted as chapters in the book. These chapters are full of details of most of the crimes the Original Night Stalker committed, Shelby's opinions, and composites from law enforcement.

See also 
 Sudden Terror, another book on the Original Night Stalker.

References 

2014 non-fiction books
Non-fiction crime books
Novels set in California
Novels set in the 20th century
Non-fiction books about serial killers
Joseph James DeAngelo